The Mexico men's national under-18 basketball team, is controlled by the Asociación Deportiva Mexicana de Baloncesto ADEMEBA (Mexican Basketball Association)  It represents Mexico in international under-18 (under age 18) basketball competitions. 

Its best result was 5th place at the 2012 FIBA Americas Under-18 Championship.

Competitions

Performance at FIBA Under-19 World Championship
yet to qualify

See also
Mexico men's national basketball team
Mexico women's national basketball team
Mexico men's national under-17 basketball team
Mexico men's national 3x3 team

References

External links
Official website
FIBA Profile
Latinbasket – Mexican Men National Team U18/19
Archived records of Mexico team participations

Men's national under-18 basketball teams
Basketball